Almonacid may refer to:
 Almonacid de la Cuba, municipality in the province of Zaragoza, Aragon, Spain
Almonacid de la Cuba Dam
 Almonacid de la Sierra, municipality in the province of Zaragoza
 Almonacid del Marquesado municipality located in the province of Cuenca, Castile-La Mancha, Spain
 Almonacid de Zorita municipality located in the province of Guadalajara, Castile-La Mancha
 Almonacid de Toledo, municipality in the province of Toledo, Castile-La Mancha
Almonacid de los Oteros, former name of Valdesaz de los Oteros, a village in Pajares de los Oteros municipality, province of León, Castile and León
Battle of Almonacid
 Vall de Almonacid (La Vall d'Almonesir), municipality in the comarca of Alto Palancia, Castellón Province, Valencia, Spain
Algimia de Almonacid municipality in the comarca of Alto Palancia, Land of Valencia

People
Patricio Almonacid, Chilean professional road bicycle racer